Bwaidoka is an Austronesian language spoken in Milne Bay Province of Papua New Guinea. It is a local lingua franca.

Phonology

Consonants 

  can be pronounced as alveolar , or dental  when preceding central or back vowels.
  can be pronounced as a voiced plosive , or as a fricative  on an unstressed syllable.

Vowels 

 Vowel sounds  do not occur following labialized consonants.

References 

Nuclear Papuan Tip languages
Languages of Milne Bay Province